The 2020 NCAA Division I baseball season, play of college baseball in the United States organized by the National Collegiate Athletic Association (NCAA) at the Division I level, began on February 14, 2020.  On March 12, it was announced that the 2020 NCAA tournament would be canceled due to the coronavirus pandemic. The decision whether to continue with an abbreviated season was left to individual schools and conferences.

Realignment
Akron restarted its program within the Mid-American Conference. Akron previously dropped baseball after the 2015 season.
Savannah State moved all sports to NCAA Division II, departing the Mid-Eastern Athletic Conference and returning to its former home of the Southern Intercollegiate Athletic Conference.
Boise State restarted its program within the Mountain West Conference, but dropped it again in July due to a reduction in the athletic department's budget. Boise State previously dropped baseball after the 1980 season.
Merrimack upgraded all sports, including baseball, to NCAA Division I from NCAA Division II, joining the Northeast Conference.

Format changes
The MEAC dissolved its divisions.

Ballpark changes
 The 2020 season was to be the first for UConn at Elliot Ballpark, replacing J. O. Christian Field. The team was originally scheduled to play its first game there on March 29 against Seton Hall.
 Oklahoma State originally planned to inaugurate O'Brate Stadium on March 20, 2020, replacing Allie P. Reynolds Stadium after the first 14 home games of the 2020 season. The first scheduled game at the new ballpark was against the TCU Horned Frogs. Oklahoma State's season was canceled on March 13.
 The 2020 season was the last for Florida at McKethan Stadium, before the season was canceled on March 17. The team's last game at the venue was on March 10, a loss against the rival Florida State Seminoles.
 The 2020 season was expected to be the last that Marshall would play off-campus. The Thundering Herd scheduled most of its 2020 home games at Kennedy Center Field, part of a YMCA recreation camp about 7 miles from its Huntington, West Virginia campus; the remainder were at Appalachian Power Park in Charleston, West Virginia, more than 50 miles from campus. Ground was broken on a new on-campus ballpark in October 2019, and the new facility is scheduled to open for 2021.

Season outlook

Conference standings

Aborted conference tournaments
The below conferences would have ended their regular seasons with a single-elimination tournament or a double-elimination tournament; all were cancelled when the NCAA ended the spring sports season on March 12.

College World Series

The 2020 College World Series was scheduled to start on June 12 in Omaha, Nebraska, but was cancelled due to the coronavirus pandemic and the NCAA prematurely ending spring sports for the 2019-2020 academic year.

Coaching changes
This table lists programs that changed head coaches at any point from the first day of the 2020 season until the day before the first day of the 2021 season.

References